In Roman timekeeping, a day was divided into periods according to the available technology. Initially the day was divided into two parts: the ante meridiem (before noon) and the post meridiem (after noon). With the advent of the sundial circa 263 BC, the period of the natural day from sunrise to sunset was divided into twelve hours.

Variation
An hour was defined as one twelfth of the daytime, or the time elapsed between sunset and sunrise. Since the  duration varied with the seasons, this also meant that the length of the hour changed. Winter days being shorter, the hours were correspondingly shorter and vice versa in summer.  At Mediterranean latitude, one hour was about 45 minutes at the winter solstice, and 75 minutes at summer solstice.

The Romans understood that as well as varying by season, the length of daytime depended on latitude.

Subdivision of the day and night

Civil day
The civil day (dies civilis) ran from midnight (media nox) to midnight. The date of birth of children was given as this period.

It was divided into the following parts:

 Media nox (midnight)
 Mediae noctis inclinatio (the middle of the night)
 Gallicinium (cock crowing)
 Conticinium (cock stops crowing)
 Diluculum (dawn)
 Mane (morning)
 Antemeridianum tempus (forenoon)
 Meridies (mid-day)
 Tempus pomeridianum (afternoon)
 Solis occasus (sunset)
 Vespera (evening)
 Crepusculum (twilight)
 Prima fax (lighting of candles)
 Concubia nox (bed-time)
 Intempesta nox (far into the night)
 Inclinatio ad mediam noctem (approaching midnight)

Natural day
The natural day (dies naturalis) ran from sunrise to sunset.

The hours were numbered from one to twelve as hora prima, hora secunda, hora tertia, etc. To indicate that it is a day or night hour Romans used expressions such as for example prima diei hora (first hour of the day), and prima noctis hora (first hour of the night).

Timekeeping devices
The Romans used various ancient timekeeping devices. The sundial was imported from Sicily in 263 BC and they were set up in public places. Sundials were used to calibrate water clocks. The disadvantage of sundials, or shadow clocks, was that they worked only in sunshine and had to be recalibrated depending on the latitude and season.

Legacy
The Roman day starting at dawn survives today in the Spanish word siesta, literally the sixth hour of the day (sexta hora).
The daytime canonical hours of the Catholic Church take their names from the Roman clock: the prime, terce, sext and none occur during the first (prīma) = 6 am, third (tertia) = 9 am, sixth (sexta) = 12 pm, and ninth (nōna) = 3 pm, hours of the day.
The English term noon is also derived from the ninth hour. This was a period of prayer initially held at three in the afternoon but eventually moved back to midday for unknown reasons. The change of meaning was complete by around 1300.
The terms a.m. and p.m. are still used in the 12-hour clock, as opposed to the 24-hour clock.

See also

 Ancient Greek calendars
 Egyptian calendar
 Roman calendar
 Relative hour

References

History of timekeeping
Time measurement systems
Timekeeping